Vomitory can refer to:

Vomitorium, an architectural feature in Ancient Roman amphitheatres
Vomitory (band), a death metal band from Sweden